The 1997 NCAA Division I baseball tournament was played at the end of the 1997 NCAA Division I baseball season to determine the national champion of college baseball.  The tournament concluded with eight teams competing in the College World Series, a double-elimination tournament in its fifty first year.  Eight regional competitions were held to determine the participants in the final event.  Each region was composed of six teams, resulting in 48 teams participating in the tournament at the conclusion of their regular season, and in some cases, after a conference tournament.  The fifty-first tournament's champion was LSU, coached by Skip Bertman.  The Most Outstanding Player was Brandon Larson of LSU.

Regionals
The opening rounds of the tournament were played across eight regional sites across the country, each consisting of a six-team field. Each regional tournament is double-elimination, however region brackets are variable depending on the number of teams remaining after each round. The winners of each regional advanced to the College World Series.

Bold indicates winner.

Atlantic Regional
Hosted by Miami (FL) at Mark Light Field in Coral Gables, Florida.

Central Regional
Hosted by Texas Tech at Dan Law Field in Lubbock, Texas.

East Regional
Hosted by Florida State at Dick Howser Stadium in Tallahassee, Florida.

Mideast Regional
Hosted by Mississippi State at Dudy Noble Field in Starkville, Mississippi.

Midwest Regional
Hosted by Oklahoma State at Allie P. Reynolds Stadium in Stillwater, Oklahoma.

South I Regional
Hosted by Louisiana State at Alex Box Stadium in Baton Rouge, Louisiana.

South II Regional
Hosted by Alabama at Sewell–Thomas Stadium in Tuscaloosa, Alabama.

West Regional
Hosted by Stanford at Sunken Diamond in Stanford, California.

College World Series

Participants

Results

Bracket

Game results

All-Tournament Team
The following players were members of the College World Series All-Tournament Team.

Notable players
 Alabama: Dustan Mohr, Andy Phillips
 Auburn: Josh Hancock, Tim Hudson, David Ross
 LSU: Brandon Larson
 Miami (FL): Pat Burrell, Bobby Hill, Aubrey Huff, Jason Michaels
 Mississippi State: Eric DuBose, Matt Ginter, Adam Piatt
 Rice: Matt Anderson, Lance Berkman, Kevin Joseph
 Stanford: Jeff Austin, Tony Cogan, Chad Hutchinson, Kyle Peterson
 UCLA: Eric Byrnes, Troy Glaus, Tom Jacquez, Jim Parque, Eric Valent

References

NCAA Division I Baseball Championship
 
Baseball in Lubbock, Texas
Events in Lubbock, Texas
Sports competitions in Texas